Tajdīd is the Arabic word for renewal. In an Islamic context, tajdīd refers to the revival of Islam, in order to purify and reform society, to move it toward greater equity and justice. One who practices tajdīd is a mujaddid.

See also
 Islah
 The Revival of the Religious Sciences

References

Further reading
 Alvi, Sajida S. "The Mujaddid and Tajdīd Traditions in the Indian Subcontinent: An Historical Overview." Journal of Turkish Studies 18 (1994): 1-15.

Islamic terminology
Muslim reformers